is a Japanese actor from Kitakyushu, Fukuoka Prefecture. Haruta joined the J.A.C (Japan Action Club), a theater troupe founded by Sonny Chiba, after leaving high school.

Filmography
 The Yagyu Conspiracy (1978) - Haruta
 Sanada Yukimura no Bōryaku (1979)
 Shadow Warriors (Hattori Hanzō: Kage no Gundan) (1980) – Kiheiji
 Dai Sentai Goggle V (1982–1983) – Kanpei Kuroda / Goggle Black
 Kagaku Sentai Dynaman (1983–1984) – Ryuu Hoshikawa / Dyna Black
 Juspion (1985) – Mad Gallant
 Choujinki Metalder (1987) - Master (episode 25)
 Sekai Ninja Sen Jiraiya (1988) – Wind Ninja Mafuuba
 Dennou Keisatsu Cybercop (1988) – Pai Lo (episode 23)
 Tokkyu Shirei Solbrain (1991) – Sazamoto (episode 08)
 Tokusou Exceedraft (1992) – Ace Spade (episodes 07-08)
 Kamen Rider Blade (2004) – Yoshito Hirose
 Engine Sentai Go-onger: Boom Boom! Bang Bang! GekijōBang!! (2008) – Shishi-no-Shin
 Gokaiger Goseiger Super Sentai 199 Hero Great Battle (2011) – Kanpei Kuroda
 Kamen Rider Eternal (2011) – Doctor Prospect aka Eyes Dopant
 Zyuden Sentai Kyoryuger (2013–2014) – Genryu Rippukan
 Shuriken Sentai Ninninger (2015) - Wind Ninja Mafuuba (via Jiraiya's photo archive footage)

References

External links
Gran Papa Production Profile
Haruta's personal blog

1955 births
Living people
Japanese male film actors
Japanese male television actors
People from Kitakyushu
20th-century Japanese male actors
21st-century Japanese male actors